Anthony Souaiby  (born 9 July 1998) is a Lebanese swimmer. He competed in the men's 50 m breaststroke and men's 100 m freestyle at the 2017 World Aquatics Championships.

References

1998 births
Living people
Lebanese male swimmers
Lebanese male freestyle swimmers
Male breaststroke swimmers
Place of birth missing (living people)